Paolo II Vitelli was an Italian condottiero and cavalryman. A member of the Vitelli family, he was born in Città di Castello and died in Parma. He was the son of Angela de' Rossi and her second husband Alessandro Vitelli.

References

Counts of Montone
1519 births
1574 deaths
People from Città di Castello
16th-century condottieri